Sir Austin Chapman  (10 July 186412 January 1926) was an Australian politician who served in the House of Representatives from 1901 until his death in 1926. He held ministerial office in the governments of Alfred Deakin and Stanley Bruce, serving as Minister for Defence (1903–1904), Postmaster-General (1905–1907), Minister for Trade and Customs (1907–1908, 1923–1924), and Minister for Health (1923–1924).

Early life
Chapman was born on 10 July 1864 in Bong Bong, New South Wales. He was the son of Monica (née Cain; also spelt Kean or Kein) and Richard Chapman, his father being a wheelwright and publican. His mother was born in Ireland. His given name was spelled "Austen" until 1897.

Chapman attended the state school in Marulan until the age of 14, when he was apprenticed to a saddler working in Goulburn and Mudgee. By 1885 he was operating Chapman's Hotel in Bungendore, close to the eventual site of Canberra. Chapman moved to Sydney in 1887 and went into partnership with Edward William O'Sullivan in an auctioneering firm, of which he was managing partner. He was also the proprietor of the Emu Inn on Bathurst Street. His partnership with O'Sullivan was dissolved in 1889, and he subsequently established the Royal Hotel in Braidwood.

New South Wales politics
In 1891 Chapman was elected to the New South Wales Legislative Assembly as MLA for Braidwood. He was an active supporter of federation of the Australian colonies.

Federal politics

In 1901 Chapman was elected to the first House of Representatives as MP for the Division of Eden-Monaro (his brother Albert succeeded him as the member for Braidwood in the New South Wales Parliament). A Protectionist, he was Minister for Defence in the first ministry of Alfred Deakin (1903–04), Postmaster-General in the second Deakin ministry (1905–08), and Minister for Trade and Customs from 1907 to 1908. After a long period on the backbench as a result of a stroke in 1909, which paralysed one of his arms, he was appointed Minister for Trade and Customs and Minister for Health in the Bruce government in February 1923.  He was criticised by both Nationalists and the Country Party and he resigned in May 1924 on the grounds of ill health and was subsequently made a KCMG.

Chapman had a significant role during the selection of Australia's national capital site, Canberra. A strong advocate for the rival site of Dalgety—legislated as the capital site by the Seat of Government Act 1904—he stated in August 1906 that, "I will defend Dalgety to the end. Any change from the selection already made can only be achieved over my political corpse." 

In early 1908, he conceded that Canberra was "the second best site, but Dalgety easily stands first." As the process finally reached its conclusion, later in 1908, Chapman was suffering ill health. In his absence, although he had been paired for the ballots so as not to prejudice the outcome, at the ninth ballot Dalgety went down to Yass-Canberra by 39 votes to 33. 

However, once Canberra had been selected, Chapman strenuously advocated the development of the site on the Molonglo River near Queanbeyan, which like Dalgety was in his electorate. The success of his efforts benefited many of his friends who owned land in the area, and also greatly boosted trade in Queanbeyan, the nearest town to the site. He was still MP for Eden-Monaro at the time of his death in Sydney on 12 January 1926 of cerebro-vascular disease, before he could sit in the first Parliament House in Canberra, which opened in May 1927. He was survived by his wife, two daughters and two sons, James Austin Chapman and John Austin Chapman who both became distinguished soldiers. The Canberra suburb of Chapman was named after him.

References

 

1864 births
1926 deaths
Commonwealth Liberal Party members of the Parliament of Australia
Australian Knights Commander of the Order of St Michael and St George
Australian politicians awarded knighthoods
Protectionist Party members of the Parliament of Australia
Members of the Cabinet of Australia
Members of the Australian House of Representatives for Eden-Monaro
Members of the Australian House of Representatives
Australian federationists
Members of the New South Wales Legislative Assembly
People from Bowral
Politicians from Sydney
Australian auctioneers
Nationalist Party of Australia members of the Parliament of Australia
Defence ministers of Australia
20th-century Australian politicians
Australian Ministers for Health